Candalides riuensis is a species of butterfly of the family Lycaenidae. It was described by Gerald Edward Tite in 1963. It is found on the Louisiade Archipelago.

References

Candalidini
Butterflies described in 1963